Tribes and Empires: Storm of Prophecy is a 2017 Chinese television series adapted from the novel of the same name written by Jin Hezai, who also wrote Legend of Winged Tribe, and directed by Cao Dun. It is part of the Novoland series, a media franchise depicting the fictional universe with a known world of three continents and nine provinces divided into the prosperous Eastern Land of Zhongzhou and the nomadic Eight Tribes in Hanzhou.

It stars Huang Xuan, Shawn Dou, Zhou Yiwei, Xu Lu, Janice Man and Zhang Jianing. The series airs on iQiyi, Tencent and Youku starting November 21, 2017. The series was a hit among international fans due to its high standard of production, impressive storyline and exceptional performance. The series currently has a 6.8 rating on Douban.

Synopsis
The series is set in the fictional world of Novoland and tells the story of loyalty, friendship, enmity and romance between the young descendants during the twilight years of the Duan Dynasty. The Duan Dynasty has been ruled by the royal Muyun Clan for more than 300 years, assisted by the Muru Clan and its powerful army in controlling Zhongzhou and suppressing the eight nomadic tribes in Hanzhou.

Our three young male protagonists find their lives and fates intertwined in historical intrigue, political turmoil, and the worlds of magical beings.

With the birth of the sixth prince of the Duan Dynasty, he is prophesied to "bring chaos to the world when he holds the Emperor's sword". Though a prince and son of Emperor Ming, Muyun Sheng (Zheng Hao / Huang Xuan) lived a lonely and isolated childhood accompanied only by a personal attendant Lan Yu Er. Growing up a kind-hearted young man, he is shunned by others and seen as dangerous due to the prophecy and for being half-human and half-spirit. His life changes when Muru Hanjiang is assigned as his companion in the palace and the two becomes friends. Hanjiang encourages the prince to find out about the disappearance of his mother, a beautiful Mei spirit who became Emperor Ming's Consort Yinrong (Janine Chang). With the discovery of the truth and inheritance of a magical orb, the Muyun Pearl left behind by his mother, the young prince begins his journey in the treacherous Duan court, and becomes a master painter while discovering the world of magical arts. He eventually falls in love with a Mei spirit woman residing in the orb, whom he names Pan Xi (Janice Man). He does not believe in prophecies and uses his own will to suppress his dark side to prevent calamity.

Muru Hanjiang (Shi Yunpeng / Shawn Dou), the youngest son of General Muru Shuo, is also plagued by a prophecy where he will usurp the Duan Dynasty and become future Emperor. In a display of loyalty to the Duan Dynasty, the General abandons him at a temple. He grows up as Hanjiang and becomes a resilient young man well trained in martial arts. He incidentally saves the young Su Yuning (Eleanor Lee / Xu Lu) and sends her back to the Novoland Inn, but gets mistaken as a thief and thrown in the inn's dungeon to work as a fighter slave for the entertainment of the rich and powerful. He meets and befriends a young Shuofeng Heye, who is originally from the Hanzhou nomadic tribes and sold into slavery. Without realizing the sins of the past generation, the two new friends work together to survive. Hanjiang makes it to the Muru mansion but discovers that his hero, General Muru, is the cold-hearted father that abandoned him. In despair, he willingly stabs himself in the chest at the General's request to kill himself. He survives and for his loyalty, is spared and assigned as the sixth prince's companion. He reunites and falls in love with Su Yuning, who is prophesied to be the future Empress of Duan and destined to marry a prince from the Muyun Clan. He does not care for the prophecy and eventually leaves the palace to join the army, leaving behind a dear friend and young love whom he will meet again.

Shuofeng Heye (Zheng Wei / Zhou Yiwei) was the heir to the Chieftain of the Northern Hanzhou Shuofeng Clan. Under his father's leadership, the tribe finally wins over fertile land from the Suqin tribe and looks forward to a better life, but catastrophe struck. Heye's parents and almost the entire tribe was massacred by the Muru Army for unintentionally harboring a runaway convict of Duan. The surviving children were enslaved, brought to Zhongzhou to becomes a fighter. It is here where he befriends Hanjiang and meets the woman who buys over his slave contract and eventually becomes the love of his life, Muyun Yanshuang (Zhang Jianing), Princess Jing of Duan. The three young men meets in a twist of fate to discover the sins inherited from their parents. Heye eventually returns to Hanzhou and finds new family and reunite with old ones. Driven by vengeance and a desire for a better life for the people of Hanzhou, he pursues his destiny to be the "Tie Qin" to unite the eight nomadic tribes to revolt against Duan.

The series also depicts the intertwined fates of the past generation: the love triangle in the royal Muyun Clan between Emperor Ming (Lu Fangsheng), Consort Yinrong (Janine Chang), and Empress Nanku (Jiang Qinqin); the rivalry amongst the Princes Muyun Han (Li Zifeng), Muyun Lu (Sun Jian), Muyun Hege (Peng Guanying); the hidden agendas of the Wanzhou Muyun Clan, led by the conniving father-son duo Muyun Luan (Wang Qianyuan), and Muyun De (Zhang Xiaochen) with the help of the mysterious Mo Yu Chen (Zhao Wei); the people seeking to reinstate the fallen Sheng Dynasty, Princess Ji Yuncong (Kan Qingzi), and Long Jinhuan (Du Yuming).

Pain and sorrows of past wounds now manifest in the new generation. Can they escape from the storm of prophecies?

Cast
Clans in Zhongzhou
The Muyun and Muru Clans signed a pact of trust 300 years ago after taking over Zhongzhou from the Sheng Dynasty. Both vowed to defend each other's status and glory as the ruling royal clan and military clan of the Duan Dynasty.

Muyun Clan
Invaded Zhongzhou and overthrew the Sheng Dynasty with the Muru Clan 300 years ago. The current royal family of the Duan Dynasty who has ruled Zhongzhou and subjugated Hanzhou from the capital, Tian Qi. Infighting amongst Clan members and the Duan court led to bloodshed and two attempted coups to install Muyun Hege as the new Emperor of Duan. 

Muru Clan
Invaded Zhongzhou and overthrew the Sheng Dynasty with the Muyun Clan 300 years ago. The aides of the current royal family and entrusted with great military power, the Muru Army commands great fear amongst the Hanzhou Tribes. The Muru Clan suffers from political machinations in the war with the Helan Tribe and subsequent second coup. Despite years of meritorious service, the clan is eliminated under the rule of Muyun Hege - the army is disbanded, men are exiled to the land of the Titans to build a new city, and women and the young are beheaded.

Nanku Clan
A powerful clan with ministers in court and a clanswoman as Empress, the clan was eventually banished after the first coup failed.

Nomadic Tribes in Hanzhou
At the start of the series, the eight nomadic tribes were competing and killing one another, unable to fight against persecution by the Duan court and Muru Army. It is later revealed that the tribes were united 300 years ago, but cursed by a prophet from Duan to suffer from in-fighting and never to pose a threat to Zhongzhou ever again.

Shuofeng Tribe
The leader of the nomadic tribes in Hanzhou before the rise of the Duan Dynasty 300 years ago, the Tie Qin was from Shuofeng and wields the legendary sword. The Duan Dynasty's Muyun and Muru Clans were later revealed to be of nomadic lineage and rose from the sub-branches of the Shuofeng Tribe. During the start of the series, they were living in harsh conditions and eventually annihilated by the Muru Army.

Helan Tribe
Annihilated by the Muru Army at the start of the series, sibling Helan Tieyuan and Helan Tieduo were able to rebuild the tribe with the help of someone in Duan. 

Others
People in Duan court

Magical beings
In addition to Humankind, they form the six intelligent races of Novoland: Spirits, Snow Wolves, Merfolks, Titans, Winged People, and Dwarves.

People in Zhongzhou

People in Hanzhou

Production
Produced by Novoland International Cultural Communication Ltd, Tribes and Empires: Storm of Prophecy is one of the most expensive Chinese drama produced, boasting a budget ranging from 300 Million RMB to 500 Million RMB. Filming began in August 2015 at Xinjiang, China and wrapped up on 27 May 2016 at Hikone, Japan; taking a total of 270 days.

Crew
The series is directed by Cao Dun, who directed the hit social commentary Dwelling Narrowness. It is co-written by Jin Hezai, the author of the original novel. Other notable cast members include artistic director Huang Wei who once worked as the creative director of Vogue and is known for his costume designs in Tiny Times and My Sunshine; as well as stunt choreographer Lin Peng who has mostly worked in Hollywood productions like Kingsman: The Secret Service and Urban Games.

It is reportedly the first Chinese television series to employ the Animatronics filming technique. The special effects are handled by French company Technicolor SA.

Awards and nominations

International broadcast

References

External links

Chinese fantasy television series
Television shows based on Chinese novels
Novoland
2017 Chinese television series debuts
Chinese web series
Hunan Television dramas
2017 web series debuts